Bangor Township is a township in Pope County, Minnesota, United States. The population was 217 at the 2000 census.

According to Warren Upham, the township may be named after Bangor, Maine.

Geography

Demographics
As of the census of 2000, there were 217 people, 66 households, and 50 families residing in the township.  The population density was 6.2 people per square mile (2.4/km2).  There were 77 housing units at an average density of 2.2/sq mi (0.8/km2).  The racial makeup of the township was 97.70% White, 0.92% Native American, and 1.38% from two or more races. Hispanic or Latino of any race were 0.46% of the population.

There were 66 households, out of which 42.4% had children under the age of 18 living with them, 72.7% were married couples living together, and 24.2% were non-families. 19.7% of all households were made up of individuals, and 12.1% had someone living alone who was 65 years of age or older.  The average household size was 3.29 and the average family size was 3.88.

In the township the population was spread out, with 36.9% under the age of 18, 8.8% from 18 to 24, 27.2% from 25 to 44, 17.5% from 45 to 64, and 9.7% who were 65 years of age or older.  The median age was 32 years. For every 100 females, there were 114.9 males.  For every 100 females age 18 and over, there were 101.5 males.

The median income for a household in the township was $38,125, and the median income for a family was $46,250. Males had a median income of $26,250 versus $23,750 for females. The per capita income for the township was $12,600.  About 8.7% of families and 17.2% of the population were below the poverty line, including 22.5% of those under the age of eighteen and 22.2% of those 65 or over.

References

Townships in Pope County, Minnesota
Townships in Minnesota